Marjolein Buis defeated Sabine Ellerbrock in the final, 6–3, 6–4 to win the women's singles wheelchair tennis title at the 2016 French Open.

Jiske Griffioen was the defending champion, but was defeated in the quarterfinals by Jordanne Whiley.

Seeds

Draw

Finals

References
 Entry list
 Draw

Wheelchair Women's Singles
French Open, 2016 Women's Singles